The Russian tortoise (Testudo horsfieldii), also commonly known as the Afghan tortoise, the Central Asian tortoise, Horsfield's tortoise, four-clawed tortoise, and the (Russian) steppe tortoise, is a threatened species of tortoise in the family Testudinidae. The species is endemic to Central Asia. Human activities in its native habitat contribute to its threatened status.

Etymology
Both the specific name, horsfieldii, and the common name "Horsfield's tortoise" are in honor of the American naturalist Thomas Horsfield.

Systematics
This species is traditionally placed in Testudo. Due to distinctly different morphological characteristics, the monotypic genus Agrionemys was proposed for it in 1966, and was accepted for several decades, although not unanimously. DNA sequence analysis generally concurred, but not too robustly so. However, in 2021, it was again reclassified in Testudo by the Turtle Taxonomy Working Group and the Reptile Database, with Agrionemys being relegated to a distinct subgenus that T. horsfieldii belonged to. The Turtle Taxonomy Working Group lists five separate subspecies of Russian tortoise, but they are not widely accepted by taxonomists:

 T. h. bogdanovi Chkhikvadze, 2008 – southern Krygystan, Tajikistan, Uzbekistan, Turkmenistan
 T. h. horsfieldii (Gray, 1844) – Afghanistan/Pakistan and southern Central Asia
 T. h. kazachstanica Chkhikvadze, 1988 – Kazakhstan/Karakalpakhstan
 T. h. kuznetzovi Chkhikvadze, Ataev, Shammakov & Zatoka, 2009 – northern Turkmenistan, southern Uzbekistan
 T. h. rustamovi Chkhikvadze, Amiranschwili & Atajew, 1990 – southwestern Turkmenistan

Description
Females grow slightly larger to accommodate eggs. Males average .
 
Russian tortoises are sexually dimorphic. Males tend to have longer tails generally tucked to the side, and longer claws; females have a short, fat tail, with shorter claws than the males. The male has a slit-shaped vent (cloaca) near the tip of its tail; the female has an asterisk-shaped vent (cloaca).
Russian tortoises have four toes. Coloration varies, but the shell is usually a ruddy brown or black, fading to yellow between the scutes, and the body is straw-yellow and brown depending on the subspecies.

The male Russian tortoise courts a female through head bobbing, circling, and biting her forelegs. When she submits, he mounts her from behind, making high-pitched squeaking noises during mating.

The species can spend as much as 9 months of the year in dormancy.

Captivity
Russian tortoises are popular pets. They can be kept indoors or outdoors, but outdoor tortoise enclosures generally require less equipment and upkeep, and are preferable if the keeper lives in an appropriate climate. Indoor enclosures should measure 8’L x 4’W x 2.5’H, or otherwise offer 32 square feet of floor space. Indoors, specialized equipment is required to maintain moderate temperatures and moderate humidity, with UVB light available in an appropriate strength.

In captivity, Russian tortoises’ diet typically consists of lamb's lettuce, plantains and various other dark leafy greens. The diet should be as varied as possible to reduce the risk of imbalanced nutrition. Water is important for all species; the tortoise, being an arid species, will typically get water from their food, but they still need a constant supply. Young Russian tortoises should be soaked 1-2x/weekly in lukewarm water no deeper than their elbows to keep hydrated. Tortoises typically empty their bowels in water to hide their scent; this is an instinct, and it also helps keep their enclosure cleaner.

Russian tortoises can live up to 50 years, and require annual hibernation.

Russian tortoises do not require a CITES Article X certificate.

1968 Moon flight
In September 1968 two Russian tortoises flew to the Moon, circled it, and returned safely to Earth on the Soviet Zond 5 mission. Accompanied by mealworms, plants, and other lifeforms, they were the first Earth creatures to travel to the Moon.

References

Further reading
 (2008). "Reptiles used in traditional folk medicine: conservation implications". Biodiversity and Conservation 17(8): 2037–2049.  (HTML abstract, PDF first page).
 (2005). "Environmentally caused dwarfism or a valid species – Is Testudo weissingeri Bour, 1996 a distinct evolutionary lineage? New evidence from mitochondrial and nuclear genomic markers". Molecular Phylogenetics and Evolution 37: 389–401. .
 (1966). "Agrionemys – nouveau genre de tortues terrestres (Testudinidae) ". Bulletin de l'Académie Polonaise des Sciences II – Série des Sciences Biologiques 2: 123–125. (Agrionemys, new genus). (in French).
 (1988). Turtles and Tortoises of the World. New York: Facts on File.
 (1989). Turtles of the World. Washington, District of Columbia: Smithsonian Institution Press.
 (1990). Keeping and Breeding Tortoises in Captivity. Avon, England: R & A Publishing.
 (1988). Turtles, Tortoises and Terrapins. New York: St. Martin's Press.
 (1979). Encyclopedia of Turtles. Neptune City, New Jersey: T.F.H. Publications.
 (1994). Mediterranean Tortoises. Neptune City, New Jersey: T.F.H. Publications.
 (1991). "Horsfield's tortoise, Agrionemys horsfieldii ". Tortuga Gazette 27 (6): 1–3.

External links

Russian (Horsfield's) Tortoise Care Information
Tortoise Forum: Russian Tortoise Care Sheet
Tortoise Supply: Russian Tortoise Care Sheet
TurtleTimes - Online Resource for Tortoises and Turtles
Popular Pets: Russian Tortoise Care Sheet
Russian Tortoise Basic Care and some insight
Russian Tortoise Care and Information Resource

Testudo (genus)
Turtles of Asia
Reptiles of Central Asia
Reptiles of Russia
Reptiles of Afghanistan
Reptiles of Iran
Reptiles of Pakistan
Reptiles described in 1844
Taxa named by John Edward Gray
Space-flown life
Species endangered by the pet trade
Vulnerable fauna of Asia
Reptiles as pets
Taxobox binomials not recognized by IUCN